Rhabdosynochus is a genus of monopisthocotylean monogeneans, belonging to the family Diplectanidae.

The type-species of the genus, Rhabdosynochus rhabdosynochus Mizelle & Blatz, 1941, was initially described as a member of the sub-family Tetraonchinae. The genus was then transferred to the Diplectaninae by Hargis, then to the Ancyrocephalinae by Bychowsky (1957), and finally to the Diplectanidae by Yamaguti (1963). Oliver (1987) confirmed its position within the family Diplectanidae.

Species
According to the World Register of Marine Species, species include:

 Rhabdosynochus alterinstitus Mendoza-Franco, Violante-Gonzalez & Vidal-Martinez, 2008 
 Rhabdosynochus hargisi Kritsky, Boeger & Robaldo, 2001 
 Rhabdosynochus hudsoni Kritsky, Boeger & Robaldo, 2001 
 Rhabdosynochus lituparvus Mendoza-Franco, Violante-González & Vidal-Martínez, 2008 
 Rhabdosynochus nigrescensi (Mendoza-Franco, Violante-González & Vidal-Martínez, 2006) Domingues & Boeger, 2008 
 Rhabdosynochus rhabdosynochus Mizelle & Blatz, 1941  (Type species)
 Rhabdosynochus siliquaus Mendoza-Franco, Violante-González & Vidal-Martínez, 2008 
Rhabdosynochus viridisi Montero‑Rodríguez, Mendoza‑Franco & López Téllez, 2020 
 Rhabdosynochus volucris Mendoza-Franco, Violante-González & Vidal-Martínez, 2008

Transcriptome 
The transcriptome of Rhabdosynochus viridisi has been studied in 2022, and G-Protein-Coupled-Receptors (GPCRs) were described in detail in this species, together with those of another monogenean, Scutogyrus longicornis. These were the first two transcriptomes released for monogeneans of the subclass Monopisthocotylea.

References

Diplectanidae
Monogenea genera
Parasites of fish